The Argentina national women's cricket team is the team that represents the country of Argentina in international women's cricket matches. They played their first match against a national development XI on 18 June 2007, and took part in an Americas Cup tournament in Toronto, Ontario, Canada in August 2007.

In April 2018, the International Cricket Council (ICC) granted full Women's Twenty20 International (WT20I) status to all its members. Therefore, all Twenty20 matches played between Argentina women and another international side after 1 July 2018 will be a full WT20I. In 2018, Sian Kelly was appointed as the team's coach, becoming the first female head coach of the Argentine women's cricket team.

Argentina made their WT20I debut at the 2019 South American Cricket Championship in Lima, in October 2019, where they were defeated by Brazil in the final.

In December 2020, the ICC announced the qualification pathway for the 2023 ICC Women's T20 World Cup. Argentina were named in the 2021 ICC Women's T20 World Cup Americas Qualifier regional group, alongside three other teams.

Tournament history

ICC Women's T20 World Cup Americas Qualifier
 2019: Did not participate
 2021: 4th

South American Cricket Championship
 2018: Did not participate
 2019: Runners-up

Records and statistics 

International Match Summary — Argentina Women
 
Last updated 16 October 2022

Twenty20 International 

 Highest team total: 228/4 v. Peru, 16 October 2022 at Sao Fernando Polo and Cricket Club (Campo Sede), Itaguaí.
 Highest individual score: 64, Veronica Vasquez and Lucia Taylor v. Peru, 16 October 2022 at Sao Fernando Polo and Cricket Club (Campo Sede), Itaguaí.
 Best individual bowling figures: 7/3, Alison Stocks v. Peru, 14 October 2022 at Sao Fernando Polo and Cricket Club, Itaguaí.

T20I record versus other nations

Records complete to WT20I #1281. Last updated 16 October 2022.

See also
Argentina national cricket team
List of Argentina women Twenty20 International cricketers

References

Cricket, women's
Women's national cricket teams
Women